{{DISPLAYTITLE:C4H7NO}}
The molecular formula C4H7NO (molar mass: 85.10 g/mol) may refer to:

 Acetone cyanohydrin (ACH)
 Methacrylamide
 2-Pyrrolidone
 N-Vinylacetamide (NVA)

Molecular formulas